Ivell's sea anemone (Edwardsia ivelli) is a species of sea anemone in the family Edwardsiidae. It is endemic to a single location, Widewater Lagoon in West Sussex, England, where it was first discovered by Richard Ivell. It has been listed as Data Deficient by the IUCN since 1996.

Description
There are twelve transparent tentacles, arranged in two cycles, nine tentacles in the outer cycle and three in the inner cycle. In life the tentacles of the outer cycle are held flat on the substrate, the three of the inner cycle more or less vertical, often curled over the mouth. Each tentacle has a few transverse bars of pale cream occasionally forming complete rings.

Habitat and distribution
Burrowing in soft mud in saline lagoons or sheltered creeks, it is a tiny species and easily overlooked unless deliberately sought.

It is endemic to England known from only one site, Widewater Lagoon in West Sussex, the type locality. Searches in recent years have failed to find any specimens and the species is considered extinct by some conservationists

Similar species
Although the type of locality inhabited by this species is not often searched by divers, such places are well-worth investigating. This species and Nematostella vectensis are probably the only British Anthozoans which can be considered endangered species through habitat destruction and pollution.

Ivell's sea anemone was discovered by Professor Richard Ivell, hence the species' name.

References

Edwardsia
Endemic fauna of England
Cnidarians of the Atlantic Ocean
Anthozoa of Europe
Marine fauna of Europe
Environment of West Sussex
Animals described in 1975
1975 in England
Taxonomy articles created by Polbot